Joel Haikali is a Namibian director, film producer and writer. He released his first feature film My Father's Son in 2011. He has also produced several short films, including Differences (2008), African Cowboy (2011) and Try (2012). The aforementioned shorts films were screened at the Alliance Française in Swakopmund. Haikali chairs the Namibia Film Commission.

Career
Joe Haikali is a Namibian filmmaker and has a production company called Joe Vision Production. In 2007, he attended the Pan-African Film Festival in order to make connections and network on behalf of himself and other Namibian filmmakers. His first feature film My Father's Son was released in 2011. Its narrative features dialogue in Oshiwambo, Afrikaans and English. The film's cast includes Panduleni Hailundu, Patrick Hainghono and Senga Brockerhoff. AfricAvenir and Franco-Namibian Cultural Centre (FNCC) teamed up to screen My Father's Son in September 2015, at the latter's venue in Windhoek. In an article published by Variety, Haikali spoke at the Berlinale Africa Hub in February 2018 and expressed interest in developing the Namibian industry through collaborative means with foreign counterparts. The Namibia Film Commission, an organization he chairs, approved the South Africa-Namibia-Germany co-production title The Girl from Wereldend.

Selected filmography
The World of Today (2004)
Differences (2008)
African Cowboy (2011)
My Father's Son (2011)
Try (2012)
Invisibles Kaunapawa (2019)

References

Living people
Year of birth missing (living people)
Namibian film directors
Namibian film producers